Boshears Skyfest formerly known as the Boshears Memorial Fly–In, is an annual event to honor pioneers of aviation and demonstrate aerial acrobatics in the style of a traditional air–show. The event has grown to incorporate areas of popular interest beyond aviation. NASCAR was a predominant feature of the 2009 Skyfest whereas 2010 highlighted the rise in popularity of Sprint Kart racing.

History 

The Boshears Skyfest has been an annual event in the Central Savannah River Area (CSRA) since 1991, with the exception of 2001, because of the 9/11 terrorist attacks, and 2013, when the event was pushed back to Spring 2014 because of the 2013 federal government shutdown. It began as a celebration of general aviation to honor Forrest and Buster Boshears.  The Skyfest is held the third weekend of each October at Daniel Field in Augusta Georgia.

The Boshears Skyfest has become an October staple for the Augusta area, along with the annual county fairs and Halloween. This is perhaps because children are the main target of the commemorative campaign. Brad Kyzer, the chairman of the Skyfest has said "Every kid in Augusta ought to get a chance to see it". Each year the Executive Committee of The Boshears Memorial Fly–in, Inc., awards aviation scholarships to selected applicants 16 to 18 years old who express interest in avionics. In 2010 the Committee announced they would hereafter begin accepting applications from 15-year-old applicants as well.

Tuskegee Airmen 
In 2007 six of the original Tuskegee Airmen were recognized at Boshears Skyfest. Their living presence, and the belated accolades they were long since due, enhanced the event and the participants in tandem.

Operational challenges 
An air–show is inherently dangerous and faces many operational challenges to success. The Bohears Skyfest is additionally challenged by stringent airspace restrictions, because Daniel Field is located in close proximity to the Augusta Mall.

Mishaps 
In 2005 a grass fire was started when a helicopter, while re-enacting a search and rescue, fired flares, which struck the ground and ignited a blaze. Also that same year, a parachute didn't deploy while demonstrating a jet truck.  The truck damaged about 12 feet of fence–line. There were no injuries, but some property damage occurred.

See also 

 List of airshows

References 

 Blue Skies for Boshears Skyfest 2010

External links 
 Boshears Memorial Airshow Home Page
 Team RV Formation Demonstration Team

Air shows in the United States
Annual events in Georgia (U.S. state)
Aviation in Georgia (U.S. state)
Tourist attractions in Augusta, Georgia